Softa Castle is a ruined castle in Bozyazı ilçe (district) of Mersin Province, Turkey.

Geography
However the road doesn't reach the castle and the visitors have to walk up the last  course from the nearest path.

History
The castle was built in late Roman times. Its original name was Sycae, and continued to be used under the Byzantine Empire. In the first half of the 13th century, it was captured by the Atabeg Ertokuş of the Seljuk Turks. It was also used during the Karamanid era (up to mid 15th century). In the 1470s it was captured by Gedik Ahmet Pasha of the Ottoman Empire.

Archaeology
But the ruins out of the castle spread out to ancient Arsinoe. In the southern slopes of the hill there are graves. The portal is on the west rampart. In the castle there are ruins of a palace, a bath, several cisterns and a mosque.

In popular culture
According to a popular belief, there is an underground connection between Softa Castle and Mamure Castle to the west, which so far is not proven. Another belief is that the castle is protected by snakes.

References

External links
Dick Dosseman's photo gallery of Softa Castle

Bozyazı District
Byzantine fortifications in Turkey
Archaeological sites in Mersin Province, Turkey
Byzantine sites in Anatolia
Roman sites in Turkey